Isla Mocha National Reserve is a national reserve of Chile. It occupies the central portion of Mocha Island. It is located in Tirúa, Arauco Province, Bío Bío Region, Chile.

The reserve provides habitat for the pudú and for a variety of birds, including the pink-footed shearwater. Typical vegetation includes Olivillo, Chilean Myrtle, Valdivia's Patagua, Chilean Laurel, Tepa and Winter's Bark.

References

National reserves of Chile
Protected areas of Biobío Region
Coasts of Biobío Region